The Sweetest Gift may refer to:

SONGS:
 A 1976 duet by Linda Ronstadt and Emmylou Harris

ALBUMS:
 The Sweetest Gift (Big Tom and The Mainliners album)
 The Sweetest Gift (Trisha Yearwood album)